The 2022 FIFA U-17 Women's World Cup was the 7th edition of the FIFA U-17 Women's World Cup, the multinational–international women's youth football championship, contested by the under-17 national teams of the member associations of FIFA, since its inception in 2008. The tournament was hosted by India, which would have hosted the 2020 edition before it was cancelled due to the COVID-19 pandemic. It was the second time that India have been hosting a FIFA tournament, after the men's 2017 FIFA U-17 World Cup, and the first time that India hosting a FIFA women's football tournament.

Morocco and Tanzania, along with host India, made their debuts in the tournament.

Spain were the defending champions, having won their first title in 2018. They managed to retain the title.

Host selection
India were originally selected as hosts of the 2020 FIFA U-17 Women's World Cup on 15 March 2019. On 17 November 2020, FIFA announced that the 2020 edition of the tournament would be cancelled due to the COVID-19 pandemic. Instead, India were appointed as hosts of the next edition of the tournament in 2022.

On 16 August 2022, it was announced that the All India Football Federation, or AIFF, was suspended by FIFA due to undue influence from third parties. As a result, the 2022 FIFA U-17 Women's World Cup was stripped from India, as FIFA assessed the next steps when it came to hosting the tournament. On 26 August 2022, the AIFF were reinstated by FIFA due to the AIFF administration regaining control of daily affairs. As a result, the tournament went ahead as planned.

Qualified teams
A total of 16 teams qualified for the final tournament. In addition to the hosts, 15 teams qualified from six continental competitions.

Notes

Venues 
On 13 April 2022, FIFA confirmed 3 host cities in 3 Indian states:
 Bhubaneswar, Odisha
 Margao, Goa
 Navi Mumbai, Maharashtra

Marketing

Emblem
The official emblem for the tournament was unveiled by FIFA and the local organising committee on 2 November 2019 at the Gateway of India in Mumbai. According to FIFA, the design combines elements from the natural world and Indian culture. The emblem takes the form of the tournament trophy with bright blue waves and "a paisley flourish" at its base. The two elements extend towards the top of the trophy which resembles a ball made of marigold flowers framed by a water droplet. The colour and style of the marigold was inspired by Bandhani textiles, and the stem features symbols inspired by Warli paintings and Bandhani patterns.

Mascot
The official mascot for the tournament, named Ibha, was unveiled on 11 October 2021 coinciding with the International Day of the Girl Child. Ibha is an Asiatic lioness, a lion subspecies that today survives in the wild only in India. The name Ibha means "one with good vision or judgement" in Khasi, a language spoken primarily in the state of Meghalaya. According to FIFA, the mascot represents Nari Shakti (woman power) and is a "strong, playful and charming Asiatic lioness that aims to inspire and encourage women and girls by using teamwork, resilience, kindness and empowering others."

Slogan
The official slogan for the tournament - "Kick Off The Dream" - was unveiled in February 2020.

Draw
The official draw  took place on 24 June 2022, 12:00 local time CEST (UTC+2) at the FIFA headquarters in Zürich, Switzerland. The teams were allocated based on their performances in the 5 previous U-17 Women's World Cups, five bonus points are added to each of the confederation's current champions that won the respective qualifying tournament (for this cycle).
The hosts India were automatically assigned to position A1. Teams of the same confederation could not meet in the group stage.

Squads

Players born between 1 January 2005 and 31 December 2007 were eligible to compete in the tournament.

Match officials 
A total of 14 referees, 28 assistant referees and 16 video match officials were appointed officially by FIFA for the tournament on 30 August 2022.
The Video assistant referee (VAR) system will be utilize for the first time in a FIFA U-17 Women's World Cup.

Originally, Susana Corella (Ecuador) was assigned as support referee only. However, she was assigned as principal referee during the tournament.

Group stage
The draw for the group stage took place on 24 June 2022.

Tiebreakers 
The top two teams of each group advanced to the quarter-finals. The format for tiebreakers were determined as follows:

If two or more teams were equal on the basis of the above three criteria, their rankings were determined as follows:

All times are local, IST (UTC+5:30).

Group A

Group B

Group C

Group D

Knockout stage
In the knockout stage, if a match was level at the end of normal playing time, a penalty shoot-out was used to determine the winner (no extra time was played).

Bracket

Quarter-finals

Semi-finals

Third place match

Final

Winners

Awards
The following awards were given for the tournament:

Goalscorers

Standings

|-
| colspan="10"| Eliminated in the quarter-finals
|-

|-
| colspan="10"| Eliminated in the group stage
|-

|}

See also 
 Sport in India – Overview of sports in India

References

External links
 

 
2022
2022 in women's association football
2022 in youth association football
2022 in Indian sport
International association football competitions hosted by India
October 2022 sports events in Asia